Meg Louise McLaughlin (born 20 March 1995) is an Australian football (soccer) player, who most recently played for Canberra United in the Australian W-League.

With Monaro Panthers in the Canberra Premier League, she broke the goalscoring record with 30 goals in 18 appearances in a single season. Her career was affected by knee injuries; she missed the entire 2014–15 season due to knee problems.

References

1995 births
Living people
Australian women's soccer players
Sydney FC (A-League Women) players
Canberra United FC players
Women's association football forwards